Whale Pass is a second class city in Prince of Wales-Hyder Census Area, Alaska, United States. The population was 31 at the 2010 census, down from 58 in 2000.

Geography
Whale Pass is located at  (56.112370, -133.141892).

Demographics

Whale Pass first appeared on the 1980 U.S. Census as the census-designated place (CDP) of "North Whale Pass." The name was shortened to Whale Pass effective as of the 1990 census. On January 31, 2017, residents voted to incorporate Whale Pass as a second-class city.

As of the census of 2000, there were 58 people, 22 households, and 13 families residing in the CDP. The population density was 1.6 people per square mile (0.6/km2). There were 51 housing units at an average density of 1.4/sq mi (0.6/km2). The racial makeup of the CDP was 96.55% White, 1.72% Native American, and 1.72% from two or more races.  Hispanic or Latino people of any race were 6.90% of the population.

There were 22 households, out of which 36.4% had children under the age of 18 living with them, 45.5% were married couples living together, 9.1% had a female householder with no husband present, and 40.9% were non-families. 22.7% of all households were made up of individuals, and 4.5% had someone living alone who was 65 years of age or older. The average household size was 2.64 and the average family size was 2.92.

In the CDP the population was spread out, with 25.9% under the age of 18, 3.4% from 18 to 24, 32.8% from 25 to 44, 34.5% from 45 to 64, and 3.4% who were 65 years of age or older. The median age was 37 years. For every 100 females, there were 114.8 males. For every 100 females age 18 and over, there were 126.3 males.

The median income for a household in the CDP was $62,083, and the median income for a family was $72,500. Males had a median income of $0 versus $0 for females.  The per capita income for the CDP was $24,040. None of the population and none of the families were below the poverty line.

History

Whale Pass was originally a logging camp and was first recognized in 1980 as North Whale Pass, before shortening the name to simply Whale Pass. From 1980 to 2017, it was an unincorporated census-designated place (CDP). On January 31, 2017, residents voted to incorporate as a second-class city, receiving just under 75% of 46 ballots cast. This would make Whale Pass the state's 116th second-class city.

Education
The school is the Whale Pass School, operated by Southeast Island School District.

References

Cities in Alaska
Cities in Prince of Wales–Hyder Census Area, Alaska
Populated coastal places in Alaska on the Pacific Ocean
Populated places established in 2017
Whales and humans